Rodas is a Spanish surname. Notable people with the surname include:

Sports 
Aslinn Rodas (born 1992), Guatemalan footballer
Braian Angola-Rodas (born 1994), Colombian basketball player
Carlos Rodas (born 1975), Colombian footballer
Elsar Rodas (born 1994), Peruvian footballer
Gerson Rodas (born 1990), Honduran footballer
Gustavo Rodas (born 1986), Argentine footballer
Héctor Rodas (born 1988), Spanish footballer
Jorge Rodas (born 1971), Guatemalan footballer
Julián Rodas (born 1982), Colombian bicycle racer
Julio Rodas (born 1966), Guatemalan footballer
Luis Rodas (born 1985), Honduran footballer
Manolo Rodas (born 1996), German footballer
Manuel Rodas (born 1984), Guatemalan cyclist
Mariandre Rodas (born 1995), Guatemalan footballer
Mateo Rodas (born 1998), Colombian footballer
Rich Rodas (born 1959), American baseball player
Rolando Patricio Vera Rodas (born 1965), Ecuadorian long-distance runner

Politics 
Haroldo Rodas (1946–2020), Guatemalan politician
Luis E. Arreaga-Rodas (born 1952), Guatemalan-American diplomat
Mauricio Rodas (born 1975), Ecuadorian politician
Modesto Rodas Alvarado (1921–1979), Honduran politician
Patricia Rodas (born 1960), Honduran politician

Other 
Ana María Rodas (born 1937), Guatemalan writer
Arturo Rodas (born 1954), Ecuadorian composer
Fabiola Rodas (born 1993), Guatemalan singer
Gaspar de Rodas (1518–1607), Spanish explorer
Juana Marta Rodas (1925–2013), Paraguayan ceramist
Lorenzo de Rodas (1930–2011), Spanish actor and film director
Modesto Delgado Rodas (1886–1963), Paraguayan painter
Rodrigo Pesántez Rodas (1937–2020), Ecuadorian poet and writer

See also

Rodas, a Cuban town and municipality

Spanish-language surnames